Michael Beattie (born 1 July 1960) is an Australian former professional rugby league footballer who played in the 1980s and 1990s. He played at club level for the St. George Dragons (captain) and Castleford (Heritage № 662).

Playing career

County Cup Final appearances
Michael Beattie played left-, i.e. number 4, in Castleford's 12-12 draw with Bradford Northern in the 1987 Yorkshire County Cup Final during the 1987–88 season at Headingley Rugby Stadium, Leeds, on Saturday 17 October 1987, played left-, i.e. number 4, in the 2-11 defeat by Bradford Northern in the 1987 Yorkshire County Cup Final replay during the 1987–88 season at Elland Road, Leeds, on Saturday 31 October 1987.

St. George career
Michael Beattie initially played for Bexly Kingsgrove and Brighton Seagulls in the St. George Junior Rugby League, but began his senior career playing  for Western Suburbs Red Devils. In 1980, he debuted with the St. George Dragons, where he formed strong  partnerships with Steve Rogers, Brian Johnston, Michael O'Connor, Chris Johns & Mark Coyne during the 1980s & early 90s. coached by Roy Masters, he played left-, i.e. number 4, in the 6-7 defeat by Canterbury-Bankstown Bulldogs in the Grand final during the 1985 NSWRL season, he signed for Castleford from St. George Dragons on 1 June 1987, back at St. George Dragons, he was named 'Captain Of The Year' in the 1992 Dally M Awards, coached by Brian Smith and was captain in the 8-28 defeat by Brisbane Broncos in the Grand final during the 1992 NSWRL season, after which he retired from playing.

He then worked for the radio station 2UE, and later became an assistant-coach to Wayne Pearce at Balmain Tigers for a short period.

With 211-appearances, he is currently fifth on St. George Dragons' "Most Career Appearances" list behind; Norm Provan (256), Billy Smith (234), Craig Young (234), and Graeme Langlands (227).

Michael Beattie was awarded Life Membership of  the St. George Dragons in 1990.

References

External links
Michael Beattie Memory Box Search at archive.castigersheritage.com

1960 births
Living people
Australian rugby league players
Castleford Tigers players
Place of birth missing (living people)
St. George Dragons captains
St. George Dragons players
Rugby league centres